Christian libertarianism is the synthesis of Christian beliefs with libertarian political philosophy, with a focus on beliefs about free will, human nature, and God-given inalienable rights.

As with some other forms of libertarianism, Christian libertarianism holds that what is prohibited by law should be limited to various forms of assault, theft and fraud. Other actions that are forbidden by Christianity can only be disciplined by the church, or in the case of children and teens, one's parents or guardians. Likewise, beliefs such as "love your neighbor as yourself" are not imposed on others so long as the non-aggression principle, which Christian libertarians believe to be foundational, has not been violated.

Definition 
According to Andrew Sandlin, an American theologian and author, Christian libertarianism is the view that mature individuals are permitted maximum freedom under God's law.

History 
The origins of Christian libertarianism in the United States can be traced back to 18th-century classical liberalism and 19th-century individualist anarchism. According to Austrian School economist and anarcho-capitalist and paleolibertarian theorist Murray Rothbard, of the three libertarian experiments during the European colonization of the Americas in the mid-17th century, all three were begun by nonconformist Protestant groups.

Martin Luther, one of the principal figures of the Protestant Reformation, is referred to as "libertarian" in the introduction to Luther and Calvin on Secular Authority, published by the Cambridge University Press. The term used here is something quite different from the ruggedly individualist ideology of American-libertarian type of right-libertarianism. The book's editor Harro Hopfl states that libertarian as well as egalitarian and communal motifs were part of the texture of Luther's theology.

English Catholic historian and Liberal statesman Lord Acton posited that political liberty is the essential condition and guardian of religious liberty. The Acton Institute, an American Christian conservative libertarian think tank, is named after him.

People 
 Justin Amash (Orthodox)
 Nikolai Berdyaev (Orthodox)
 John Dalberg-Acton, 1st Baron Acton (Roman Catholic)
 James W. Fifield Jr. (Congregationalist)
 Jesus Huerta de Soto (Roman Catholic)
 Gary Johnson (Lutheran)
 John Locke (Anglican, Unitarian)
 Andrew Napolitano (Roman Catholic)
 Albert Jay Nock (Episcopalian)
 Rand Paul (Presbyterian)
 Ron Paul (Baptist)
 Thomas Woods (Roman Catholic)
 Dr. Norman Horn (Church of Christ) 
 Kerry Baldwin (Presbyterian)

See also

References

Citations

Sources

Further reading

External links 
 Summa of the Libertarian Catholic

 
Libertarianism
Libertarianism
Libertarianism by form